Scoppito is a comune and town in the province of L'Aquila, within the central Italy's region of Abruzzo.

Sports

S.P.D. Amiternina
S.P.D. Amiternina is an Italian association football club, based in this city.

In the season 2011–12 the team was promoted for the first time, from Eccellenza Abruzzo to Serie D after.

Its colors are yellow and red.

Transport 
Scoppito has a stop on the Terni–Sulmona railway, with trains to Terni, Rieti and L'Aquila.

See also
Madonna della Strada

References